Local elections were held in Mandaluyong on May 9, 2016, within the Philippine general election. The voters elected for the elective local posts in the city: the mayor, vice mayor, one Congressman, and the councilors, six in each of the city's two legislative districts.

Background
The wives of the current city officials, will be running in their husbands' respective positions in the city. Carmelita Aguilar-Abalos, wife of Mayor Benhur Abalos will run for the Mayoralty position under the United Nationalist Alliance. While, former ABC-5 reporter Queenie Pahati-Gonzales, wife of Representative Neptali Gonzales will run as the representative of lone district of the city under the Liberal Party, one of her opponents is Reyes Barbecue president Francisco Reyes, an independent candidate.

Candidates

Mayor

Vice Mayor

Edward Bartolome is the Incumbent. His opponents are First District Councilor Anthony Suva and former Vice Mayor Danny De Guzman.

Representative, Lone District

Neptali "Boyet" Gonzales II is term-limited. His party nominated his wife, former ABC-5 reporter Queenie Pahati-Gonzales. Her main opponents are Reyes Barbecue president Francisco Reyes (running as independent), Albert Yap (also running independent) and Jack Ramel (running under PDP–Laban).

Councilors

1st District

|-bgcolor=black
|colspan=5|

2nd District

|-bgcolor=black
|colspan=5|

References

2016 Philippine local elections
Politics of Mandaluyong
2016 elections in Metro Manila